German submarine U-619 was a Type VIIC U-boat built for Nazi Germany's Kriegsmarine for service during World War II. She was laid down on 19 June 1941 by Blohm & Voss, Hamburg as yard number 595, launched on 9 March 1942 and commissioned on 23 April 1942 under Oberleutnant zur See Kurt Makowski.

Design
German Type VIIC submarines were preceded by the shorter Type VIIB submarines. U-619 had a displacement of  when at the surface and  while submerged. She had two shafts and two  propellers.

U-619 was fitted with five  torpedo tubes (four fitted at the bow and one at the stern), fourteen torpedoes, one  SK C/35 naval gun, 220 rounds, and a  C/30 anti-aircraft gun. The boat had a complement of between forty-four and sixty.

Service history
The boat's career began with training at 5th U-boat Flotilla on 23 April 1942, followed by active service on 1 October 1942 as part of the 3rd Flotilla for the remainder of her very short career.

Wolfpacks
U-619 took part in two wolfpacks, namely:
 Blitz (22 – 26 September 1942)
 Luchs (27 September – 5 October 1942)

Fate
U-619 was sunk on 5 October 1942 in the North Atlantic SW of Iceland, in position , by depth charges from RAF Hudson aircraft. All hands were lost.

Summary of raiding history

References

Bibliography

External links

German Type VIIC submarines
1942 ships
U-boats commissioned in 1942
Ships lost with all hands
U-boats sunk in 1942
U-boats sunk by depth charges
U-boats sunk by British aircraft
World War II shipwrecks in the Atlantic Ocean
World War II submarines of Germany
Ships built in Hamburg
Maritime incidents in October 1942